Charles-Ignace Gill (March 12, 1844 – September 16, 1901) was a Quebec lawyer and political figure. He represented Yamaska in the Legislative Assembly of Quebec from 1871 to 1874 and in the House of Commons of Canada as a Conservative member from 1874 to 1879.

He was born in Saint-François-du-Lac, Lower Canada in 1844, the son of Ignace Gill and studied at the Collège de Nicolet and the Université Laval. He articled in law with Ulric-Joseph Tessier, was admitted to the bar in 1867 and set up practice at Sorel. In 1870, he married Marie-Rosalie-Delphine, the daughter of Louis-Adélard Senécal. In 1871, he was elected to the provincial assembly. He resigned in 1874 to run for a seat in the House of Commons. He resigned in 1879 when he was named as a judge to the Quebec Superior Court in Richelieu district; in 1886, he was named to Montreal district. He was also a director of the Montreal, Portland and Boston Railway.

He died in Montreal in 1901.

References

 

1844 births
1901 deaths
Conservative Party of Canada (1867–1942) MPs
Members of the House of Commons of Canada from Quebec
Conservative Party of Quebec MNAs
Judges in Quebec